Alajos is a masculine given name. Notable people with the name include:

Alajos Degré (1819–1896), Hungarian lawyer and writer
Alajos Drávecz (1866–1915), Slovenian ethnologist and writer
Alajos Hauszmann (1847–1926), Austro-Hungarian architect and scholar
Alajos Károlyi (1825–1889), Austro-Hungarian diplomat
Alajos Kenyery (1892–1955), Hungarian freestyle swimmer
Alajos Keserű (1905–1965), Hungarian water polo player
Alajos Stróbl (1856–1926), Hungarian sculptor and artist
Alajos Szokolyi or Alajos Szokoly (1871–1932), Hungarian athlete and physician

Hungarian masculine given names

cs:Alois
de:Alois
it:Aloisio
la:Aloisio
pl:Alojzy
ru:Алоиз
sk:Alojz
sl:Alojz